The 2015–16 season was U.S. Lecce's fourth consecutive season in Lega Pro after their relegation from Serie A at the end of the 2011–12 season. The club competed in Lega Pro Girone C, finishing 3rd, in the Coppa Italia, where the club was knocked out in the second round by Cesena, and in the Coppa Italia Lega Pro, where the club was knocked out by Akragas in the round of 16.

Players

Squad information

out on loan

References

U.S. Lecce seasons
Lecce